Diego Viñales (born Alfredo Diego Viñales) was a former Argentinian student who was swept up in a police raid on the Snake Pit gay bar in New York's Greenwich Village in March 1970. The raid at the Stonewall Inn that had sparked rioting and gay activism had occurred the previous summer, but such raids were still common.  Taken to the police station, Viñales, who was on an expired student visa and fearful of deportation, tried to escape by jumping out a second floor window.  He landed on a spiked fence.  Viñales suffered grave injuries, but survived and was arrested. Protest marches in response to the day's events were led by gay activist groups formed in the wake of Stonewall, and helped spark greater community awareness and interest in the upcoming Christopher Street Liberation Day events scheduled for 28 June to commemorate the first anniversary of the Stonewall riots.

Life

Viñales was born Alfredo Diego Viñales in Buenos Aires in 1946 or 1947.  Named after his father who deserted the family when the boy was ten, Diego chose to use his middle name instead.  Growing up in one of the villa miseria shanty towns around Buenos Aires, Diego found a tattered travel book about New York City in a landfill, and carried it with him everywhere. It fueled his fantasies and desire to escape the misery around him.

Diego had no schooling after age 12. He was a gentle boy, and grew into a handsome, even beautiful young man, and was teased over his long eyelashes and pouty lips. Carrying water back to his mother as an adolescent, he attracted glowing attention from women of the village. Diego was apolitical and areligious. More than religion, Diego believed his life would be transformed in New York. He had heard about certain boys, the puta-timadores who hustled foreigners for money in exchange for their company, and there were rumors of a few who managed to parlay that into a ticket out of the country and were living in luxury in foreign capitals. Diego decided to go down to the Teatro Colón, where the hustler boys hung out looking for their marks, and try his luck.

In August 1967 Diego bumped into a handsome and to his eyes glamorous older man near the Teatro who asked if he liked Opera, and invited him for coffee speaking in American-accented Spanish, which is something Diego had never heard before.  Neither was being invited for coffee within his social skills, and he was uncertain how to respond, but he knew it was about more than coffee and Opera.  At a café, Jim told Diego to order "anything", but the American's Spanish wasn't quite good enough, and it came out order "everything" which Diego proceeded to do. When the waiter tried to confirm the order with Jim, he was too besotted with Diego to pay attention, and just confirmed the order, ending up with a tableful of desserts and every drink in the house.

Within a few weeks, Jim had arranged a student visa for Diego with the assistance of his Ivy college alma mater, and were soon living in Jim's apartment in the West Village.  Diego had every intention to work out his student situation and deal with his initial visa, but the seduction of being in New York City, which far outpaced what his guide book and imagination could convey, led him to postpone it, and eventually the visa expired at the turn of the new year.

In March, Jim left on one of his business trips, and Diego decided to meet up with some buddies for a drink at the Snake Pit.  Although a lot of time had elapsed since patrons fought back at the Stonewall Inn after the raid there, New York Police continued to raid gay bars, and this time it was the Snake Pit's turn.  Police rounded up everyone and took them to the station.  Diego was more panicked about his expired visa situation than he was about being targeted as gay, because he might be deported and never see Jim again. So when they were all lined up at the station in a second-floor hallway, until sunrise,  Diego spied a window with a flimsy screen, and decided to make a break for it.  He hadn't counted on the fence below.

The Snake Pit raid

Background

The police raid at the Stonewall Inn in Greenwich village had taken place nine months earlier, on June 28, 1969. Although the bar patrons who fought back and the many who rioted and protested in the days following was something new, actions by the New York Police Department against gay bars did not stop with Stonewall, and in fact continued on for months and years afterward. So when a police raid on the Snake Pit was conducted the following March, this was nothing unusual.

Raid and arrest

In the pre-dawn hours of 8 March 1970, New York City Police raided the Snake Pit at 213 West 10th Street in Greenwich Village. Police said that the Snake Pit had been operating illegally after hours. One hundred sixty-seven people were taken into custody in the raid.

During the arrest, Viñales was one of the patrons held the longest inside, before being transferred to a police wagon.  A friend noticed he was extremely frightened.  Police at the bar were verbally abusive to employees asking about their rights.

Police station and attempted escape

There was a chaotic situation at the Charles Street station, and police hurled abusive epithets at those under arrest.  Police explained that ID would not be checked, and those present would not have to post bail, but Viñales didn't hear or didn't understand.  Fearful of deportation for being a homosexual, he suddenly ran up a flight of stairs, and attempted to jump out a second floor window to the roof of an adjoining building, but missed, and landed on a spiked fence instead, provoking grave piercing injury by six spikes.

With the seriousness of the injury, the police could not simply remove him from the fence. Instead, the fire department was called, and a section of fence was cut out, Viñales was taken to St. Vincent's Hospital in critical condition, still attached to the fence.  Surgeons operated on him, with fire department personnel asked to scrub in and assist.

Immediate reaction

By that evening, 200 people had gathered in Sheridan Square to demonstrate against police repressions of gays in Greenwich Village.  Made up of members of the Gay Activists Alliance, a splinter group of the Gay Liberation Front, and of feminist organizations, they protested the arrest of the bar patrons.  They headed towards the hospital, where they conducted a "death vigil".  By late evening, the protesters had left the hospital area and were marching peaceably through the West Village.

The intense interest by news media in New York City on the Snake Pit raid and Viñales' injuries was the most of any event relating to homosexual issues since the raid on the Stonewall Inn, and was a consequence of the increased activism of the gay community in New York following Stonewall.  The Daily News, a tabloid and New York's top-selling daily newspaper, published a front-page photo the next day of Viñales with the caption "Spiked on Iron Fence".

Aftermath

The gay community had already seen a surge of organizing activity following the events at the Stonewall Inn the previous summer.  The protest march following the Snake Pit raid played a role in galvanizing interest even further among the community in time for the upcoming Christopher Street Liberation Day events already planned for 28 June.  This event, scheduled to commemorate the first anniversary of the Stonewall riots was the first Pride march celebration in the United States.

There were political repercussions as well. Democratic Congressman Ed Koch, the future mayor of New York City, accused New York City Police Commissioner Howard R. Leary of approving raids and arrests  against the gay community..

See also 

 LGBTQ culture in New York City
 List of incidents of civil unrest in New York City
 List of pre-Stonewall LGBT actions in the United States
 List of incidents of civil unrest in the United States
 Timeline of LGBT history
 Zap (action)

Notes

References

Further reading

External links 
 The Snake Pit
 Back to Stonewall

Argentine LGBT people
Argentine emigrants to the United States
1970 in New York City
People from Greenwich Village
History of LGBT civil rights in the United States
History of Manhattan
LGBT civil rights demonstrations
LGBT history in New York City
Police brutality in the United States
1970 in LGBT history
March 1970 events in the United States
1940s births
Possibly living people